Hawthorne School may refer to:

Hawthorne School (Beverly Hills, California), elementary and middle school serving Kindergarten through 8th grade in Beverly Hills, California
Hawthorne School (Missoula, Montana), elementary school located in Missoula, Montana
Hawthorne School (Canonsburg, Pennsylvania)